The USA Cup is the largest international youth soccer tournament in the Western hemisphere.  It was founded by Ivar Sorensen and Ingeborg Sorensen in cooperation with the Sons of Norway in 1985.

In the first year, there were 78 teams, and in the most recent years, it draws almost 1200 teams with more than 16,000 athletes from many American states and countries around the world.  In 2016, the tournament had teams from five continents. A swarm of referees also comes from all over the world to help officiate thousands of games.

The tournament is held in July every year in Blaine, Minnesota, at the National Sports Center.  The tournament has grown over the years and now includes a Weekend Cup tournament PRI before the weeklong tournament, vendor booths, food trucks, and a huge soccer expo inside the Sports Hall.

The facility has more than 50 football (soccer) fields, as well as softball fields, indoor ice hockey rinks, and a cycling velodrome.

The main stadium on the campus holds almost 10,000 spectators and was the home of the Minnesota United FC franchise until the team moved from a minor division to Major League Soccer (MLS) in 2017. 

In 2022 the opening ceremony for the week tournament Charlie Puth performed

See also 
Gothia Cup - Competes with Norway Cup for the largest youth football tournament in the world.
Norway Cup - For many years the largest youth football tournament in the world.

External links 
 USA Cup home page
 National Sports Center home page

Soccer in Minnesota
International club association football competitions hosted by the United States